The boys' 1500 metres speed skating competition of the 2020 Winter Youth Olympics will be held at Lake St. Moritz on 13 January 2020.

Results 
The races were held at 12:45.

References 

 

Boys' 1500m